Meltdown EP is an extended play (EP) by American rapper Pitbull, released on November 22, 2013 through Mr. 305, Polo Grounds, and RCA Records.

The EP can be purchased individually, or can be found attached onto the end of the Global Warming album under the 2013 reissue titled Global Warming: Meltdown.

Singles
"Timber" was released as the lead single on October 7, 2013. The track features guest vocals from American singer-songwriter Kesha. The single has peaked at #1 on the US Billboard Hot 100, #1 in the UK, Canada, Austria, Germany, Sweden, Denmark and the Netherlands, #4 in Australia, #6 in Spain, #3 in New Zealand, and at #8 in France. It has further peaked in the top 5 in over 25 countries. The song became a worldwide hit. This marks Pitbull's 2nd global hit. Pitbull performed the song in the AMA's, The X Factor finale, Good Morning America and also in the Jingle Balls. Timber has peaked at number one in more than 16 countries, number 2 in 7 countries, number 3 in four countries, and reached the top 10 in 4 countries and top 20 in 3 countries making it the biggest hit of 2014.

Commercial performance
The EP debuted at number 95 on the US Billboard 200 chart, with first-week sales of 10,000 copies in the United States.

Track listing

Notes
 signifies an additional producer

Sample credits
"Timber" contains a portion of the composition "San Francisco Bay", written by Lee Oskar, Keri Oskar, and Greg Errico as well as a sample of one of Pitbull's own songs, "11:59" featuring Vein.
"Do It" contains the original track of "Do It" by Tuxedo, but with Pitbull rapping over the extended instrumental breaks.

Charts

Release history

References

External links 
 Meltdown on Spotify

2013 EPs
Pitbull (rapper) albums
RCA Records EPs
Albums produced by Benny Blanco
Albums produced by Calvin Harris
Albums produced by Cirkut
Albums produced by Dr. Luke
Albums produced by Stargate